The Florida Atlantic Owls are the college baseball team of Florida Atlantic University which plays its home games at FAU Baseball Stadium. The Owls' head coach is John McCormack.

Fielding its first team in 1981, the Florida Atlantic University baseball team has experienced frequent success, shared respect from other baseball teams nationwide and the building of a power in NCAA baseball.

As of the 2017 season, the Owls have had 19 consecutive winning seasons.  Additionally, the Owls have had only four losing seasons in 41 years of competition.

Overview and history
Florida Atlantic University's baseball program began in 1981 and has seen success, growth and change in its 41 seasons of competition.  Among the changes, the most noticeable to fans would be the change of the team name in 2005.  University President Frank T. Brogan led the charge for the university to create a unified, single mark for FAU's athletic programs.  The student-body decided "Owls" should be the athletic logo and in 2005, the baseball team lost its previous identity of "Blue Wave."  Over the 30 years of competition, FAU baseball has jumped from the NAIA, to NCAA Division II, to NCAA Division I competition, and has reached success on all levels.

Steve Traylor era: The beginning
Under its first coach and first year of competition, FAU won its inaugural game, 12–8, against St. Thomas University on February 23, 1981.  Steve Traylor coached FAU from 1981–1987 and oversaw the building of a program from scratch.  After only three years of existence, FAU jumped from the NAIA level to the NCAA Division II level.  If there was any doubts about this young program belonging on that level, its very first season would prove any doubters wrong.  The Blue Wave opened the 1984 season with a win against in-state super-power University of Florida Gators, 5–4.  FAU continued to win its first five games of the season, including another major upset, this time on the road at another in-state super-power, defeating University of Miami Hurricanes, 11–10.  The Blue Wave finished the 1984 season with a record of 40–15, ranked 8th in the nation in the final NCAA Division II poll.

Kevin Cooney era: Division I and national success
During the offseason between 1987 and 1988, Steve Traylor left Florida Atlantic to become the head coach at Duke University.  FAU hired Kevin Cooney, head coach of Montclair State University in New Jersey.  Since the hiring, FAU has won 61% of their games and transformed itself from a local power in South Florida to a national baseball program on the Division I level.  Coach Cooney arrived at FAU in 1988 and began his 20th season as head coach of the Owls on opening night of the 2007 season.  Given the success and unprecedented heights that Cooney has taken FAU baseball, "Florida Atlantic" and "Kevin Cooney" have become synonymous with one another.  Entering the 2007 season, Cooney has won 680 games (at FAU) and 820 (all-time, between FAU and Montclair State University, his alma mater and where he coached from 1984–1987).

In his 19+ seasons in Boca Raton, Cooney has established a powerhouse program at a university that continues to grow.  Cooney has led the charge for FAU baseball to enjoy such successes as, 67 athletes turning professional (with 4 reaching the majors).  For these accolades and so much more, Cooney was inducted into the Palm Beach County Sports Hall of Fame in 2007.

On March 15, 2006, against Columbia University, Cooney reached a personal milestone, coaching a team to his 800th career victory.

On Thursday, April 24, 2008, Cooney announced that the 2008 season would be his last season as head coach of the Owls.  Subsequently, on May 24, exactly a month after this announcement, Cooney coached his last game as FAU head coach when the Owls lost to Western Kentucky in the play-in championship game of the Sun Belt Conference Championship Tournament.

All-time consecutive wins record
During the improbable 1999 season, when FAU finished with a school-best record of 54–9, Cooney led his team to an NCAA all-time record for consecutive wins.  Starting February 19, in a 7–4 win over Bethune-Cookman College, the Blue Wave continued on to 34 consecutive wins.  The streak lasted all the way to April 17, when Jacksonville University topped FAU, 2–1.  The streak ended two days short of lasting two complete calendar months.

March to 800
Cooney's milestone wins:
1st: March 14, 1984 (Montclair State 5, Southern Illinois 0)
100th: May 6, 1986 (Montclair State 9, Glassboro State 1)
200th: April 28, 1989 (FAU 3, UCF 2)
300th: March 15, 1993 (FAU 4, Rowan 3)
400th: March 18, 1996 (FAU 6, Northeastern 2)
500th: March 13, 1999 (FAU 8, Troy 2)
600th: March 31, 2001 (FAU 4, Stanford 3)
700th: May 9, 2003 (FAU 12, Georgia Southern 2)
800th: March 15, 2006 (FAU 8, Columbia 7)

John McCormack era: Sooner than five years
On July 1, 2008, Florida Atlantic named 18-year Assistant Coach, John McCormack, as Cooney's successor.  McCormack served as Cooney's top assistant, associate head coach and recruiting coordinator for the 18 seasons before being elevated as head coach.  With the foundation laid by Cooney, McCormack leads the Owls under intense pressure and high expectations. In 2019, John McCormack was inducted into the FAU Athletics Hall of Fame.

Individual records and honors

No-hitters
Tom Clark, 1982
Jim Hanrahan, 1984
Luis Merino, 1985
Jim Drancsak, 1986
John Sammon, 1994
Mickey Storey, 2006

FAU Baseball Hall of Fame
In 2006, Florida Atlantic University inducted the first class to its new FAU Baseball Hall of Fame.

All-Americans
17 players from FAU baseball have won recognition as "All-American": Keith Foley (1983), Mike Ryan (1984), Scott Hay (1986), Jack Penrod (1988), Todd Moser (1999), Dan Jackson (1999), Dickie Hart (1999), Randy Beam (2003), Jeff Fiorentino (2004), Mickey Storey (2005), Robbie Widlansky (2007), Mike McKenna (2008), Andy Mee (2010), Hugh Adams (2013), Brendon Sanger (2015), Rickey Santiago (2015), C.J. Chatham (2016).

Freshmen All-Americans
8 players from FAU baseball have won recognition as "Freshmen All-American": Kevin Connacher (1994), Rusty Brown (2001), Chris Pillsbury (2001), Jeff Fiorentino (2002), Derek Hutton (2002), Tim Mascia (2003), Mickey Storey (2005), Stephen Kerr (2014).

2005 Mickey Storey
In 2005, as a freshman pitcher for FAU, Mickey Storey was named Collegiate Baseball's National Freshman Pitcher of the Year.  Storey's stat line for his freshman season was one of the best posted by a pitcher in the nation.

Storey's 1.70 ERA is a school-record for a single-season, and ranked fifth in the nation for the 2005 season among pitchers on the Division I level.  His performance during the 2005 season awarded him an invitation to try out for the USA Baseball National Team.

Storey also took home numerous other awards that season, including All-American honors, Freshman All-American honors, All-Conference honors, and All-Conference Freshman honors.

2007 Robbie Widlansky
In 2007 Robbie Widlansky won the Sun Belt Conference batting title his senior season (.430 average; breaking the school's season record), and Sun Belt Player of the Year, NCAA All-American honors, and First-Team All-Conference honors.

Head coaches

Year by year records

Postseason records
Florida Atlantic is 22-25 all-time in NCAA Division I postseason history (22–23 all-time in NCAA Regionals and 0–2 in NCAA Super Regionals).

Professional Owls

Owls in the majors
Florida Atlantic Owls to reach Major League Baseball:
Tim Harikkala, pitcher (1995–2005)
Carmen Cali, pitcher (2005–2008)
Jeff Fiorentino, outfielder (2005–2008)
Tommy Murphy, outfielder (2006–2007)
Mike Crotta, pitcher (2011)
Jeff Beliveau, pitcher currently a free agent (2012–present)
Mickey Storey, pitcher (2012–2013)
R.J. Alvarez, pitcher currently a free agent (2014–present)
Ryan Garton, pitcher for the Tampa Bay Rays (2016–2021)
Austin Gomber, pitcher for the St. Louis Cardinals (2018, 2020-present)

See also
List of NCAA Division I baseball programs

Notes and references

External links
 

 
1981 establishments in Florida
Baseball teams established in 1981